Necrophila (Deutosilpha) rufithorax, is a species of carrion beetle found in India, Nepal and Sri Lanka. The species also known to live in Laos and Thailand, but might be another species.

Description
Average body length is about 17.5 to 22.3 mm. Body widely rounded posteriorly in dorsum. Pronotum widely hexagonal in shape. There are 4 spots on the pronotum. In male, the apex of elytron is truncate. But in females, elytron with elongates with convex apex.

In India, the beetle was collected in Keoladeo National Park on semi-dry carcass of mongoose, and on dry soil in pasture field.

Synonyms
 Silpha rufithorax Wiedemann, 1823
 Silpha rufithorax Harold 1877
 Eusilpha rufithorax Portevin 1903
 Eusilpha rufithorax Portevin 1905
 Silpha rufithorax Arrow 1909
 Eusilpha (Deutosilpha) rufithorax Portevin 1920
 Deutosilpha rufithorax Portevin 1926
 Silpha (Deuterosilpha) rufithorax Hatch 1928
 Oiceoptoma tetraspilotum Hope, 1833
 Oiceoptoma tetraspilotum Hope, 1834
 Silpha tetraspilota Harold 1877
 Eusilpha tetraspilota Portevin 1903
 Eusilpha tetraspilota Portevin 1905
 Silpha tetraspilota Arrow 1909
 Deutosilpha tetraspilota Portevin 1926
 Silpha (Deuterosilpha) tetraspilota Hatch 1928

References 

Silphidae
Insects of Sri Lanka
Insects of India
Beetles described in 1832